Tseten Samdup Chhoekyapa is an official of the Tibetan Government in Exile. He is the Representative of the Dalai Lama and the Tibetan Government in Exile for Central and Eastern Europe and the head of the Tibet Bureau in Geneva. He was appointed as Representative on 1 April 2008, succeeding Kelsang Gyaltsen. He has previously worked for the Tibetan exile government in India and London. He is a graduate of Columbia University in New York, and was born in Nepal after his parents had escaped from Tibet in 1959, after the Annexation of Tibet by the People's Republic of China.

He is a board member of the Tibet Institute Rikon, and a founding signatory of the Prague Declaration on European Conscience and Communism.

His deputy is Under-Secretary Dawa Gyatso.

References

Central Tibetan Administration
Representatives of Offices of Tibet
Columbia University alumni
Living people
Swiss people of Tibetan descent
Year of birth missing (living people)